Srichaur is a village development committee in Okhaldhunga District in the Sagarmatha Zone of mid-eastern Nepal. At the time of the 1991 Nepal census it had a population of 2388 living in 437 individual households. On December 15, 2010 a plane crashed in the forest of Bilandu, in the southwestern part of Shreechaur VDC.

References

External links
UN map of the municipalities of Okhaldhunga District

Populated places in Okhaldhunga District